= Clifford Lloyd =

Welsh footballer (1902–1975)

Personal information
- Full name: Clifford John Lloyd
- Date of birth: 30 September 1902
- Place of birth: Swansea, Wales
- Date of death: 1975 (aged 72–73)
- Position: Wing-half

Senior career*
Years	Team	Apps	(Gls)
1927–1930	Swansea Town	39	(0)
1930–1931	Nottingham Forest	4	(0)
1931–1932	Crystal Palace	0	(0)
1932	Waterford		
1932–1933	Barrow	0	(0)
1933	Ammanford Corries		
Total		43	(0)
- * Club domestic league appearances and goals

Clifford John Lloyd (30 September 1902 – 1975) was a Welsh footballer who played in the Football League for Nottingham Forest and Swansea Town.
